Mesón do Bento Club de Fútbol is a Spanish football team based in Mesón do Bento, Ordes, in the autonomous community of Galicia. Founded in 2000, it currently plays in Terceira Autonómica – Group 3, holding home matches at Estadio Monte Roxo, which has a capacity of 1,500 spectators.

Notes
For 2011–12 season, Mesón do Bento renounced to play in Tercera División. Ultimaltely, it was entered in Segunda Autonómica.

Season to season

1 seasons in Tercera División

References

External links
Futbolme.com profile 
senafutbolmarin.blogspot.com.es profile

Football clubs in Galicia (Spain)
Association football clubs established in 2000
Divisiones Regionales de Fútbol clubs
2000 establishments in Spain